The Kazakh Ground Forces is the land service branch of the Armed Forces of the Republic of Kazakhstan. It is one of the three uniformed military services, and is the most senior branch of the Kazakh military in order of precedence. The main tasks of the Ground Forces include the following: maintaining the readiness of troops to repel aggression, the armed defense of the territorial integrity and sovereignty of Kazakhstan, protecting the state and military facilities, peacekeeping missions. In its duties, it primarily engages in land warfare and combined arms operations, including armored and mechanized operations as well as airborne and air assault operations. It is headed by a chief military officer, the Commander of the Ground Forces who is also a member of the General Staff.

History

Soviet era 
Many large units of the Turkestan Military District was redeployed from the Turkmen SSR to Eastern Kazakhstan back in the 1960s. Immediately prior to its dissolution, the 40th Army consisted of the 78th Tank Division, the 5202nd Base for Storage of Weapons and Equipment (prior to 1989, the 71st Motor Rifle Division), the 5203rd Storage Base in Ust-Kamenogorsk (prior to 1989, the 155th Motor Rifle Division), the 5204th Storage Bade at Karaganda (prior to 1989, the 203rd Zaporozhye Khingan Motor Rifle Division), the 69th Tank Division and the 10th Fortified Area. The 69th Tank Division and the 10th Fortified Area were both disbanded in 1992.

The 57th Separate Airborne Brigade based in Aktogay, East Kazakhstan Region was the only unit of the Soviet Airborne Forces based in Kazakhstan.

Post-independence 
The Kazakh Army was founded on 9 April 1993, by the order of Defense Minister Sagadat Nurmagambetov. It followed the enacting of the law, "On Defense and Armed Forces of the Republic of Kazakhstan", which is the legal basis for the Kazakh military structures. The former Soviet structure of troops was preserved, with the Kazakh Army being made up of the Soviet 32nd Army, which had been serving in the Kazakh Soviet Socialist Republic for many years before it came under Kazakh government control in May 1992. That month, on the basis of the 5203rd Military Equipment Storage Base (formerly the 155th Motorized Rifle Division), the 511th Motorized Rifle Regiment was re-formed with a deployment in the settlement. Georgievka, Semipalatinsk Region.

In the middle of the 1990s, the Kazakh Ground Forces included the 1st Army Corps (HQ Semipalatinsk), the 68th Motor Rifle Division (Sary-Ozek in the Kyzylorda Province), with 2 motor-rifle and one tank regiments, and the 78th Tank Division (HQ Ayaguz). The IISS reported that as of 1 June 1995 Kazakh ground forces included a corps HQ; a tank division; an artillery brigade; two motor-rifle divisions (one training); an artillery regiment; an independent motor rifle regiment; a multiple rocket launcher brigade with BM-21 and 9P140 "Urugan,"; and an air assault brigade. While the 68th Division was called a motor-rifle formation, in equipment terms it had almost 300 tanks and about 500 armoured fighting vehicles. The 78th Tank Division had 350 tanks, 290 armoured fighting vehicles and 150 artillery pieces. The 210th Guards Training Center (often called the Division of Guards by Kazakh sources), had 6,000 soldiers and officers and 220 tanks and 220 artillery pieces, so was a strengthened division. In 1997, the 2nd Army Corps was created with headquarters in Almaty, under which all units and formations in the Almaty, Zhambyl and South Kazakhstan regions were transferred.

On 17 November 1997, the General Purpose Forces were formed. In 2000, on the basis of the 35th Guards Airborne Assault Brigade, the Mobile Forces of the Armed Forces were created, which in 2003 were renamed into Airmobile Forces as part of the Ground Forces. In 2015, Airmobile Troops were renamed Air Assault Troops. Since 2002, the ground forces have begun the transition to a brigade structure. In this regard, there was a process of disbandment of divisions and the creation of brigades on the basis of regiments.

Structure

Regional Commands 
On July 6, 2000, military districts were created to control the ground forces:

 Central Military District (HQ Karaganda)
 Eastern Military District (HQ Semey)
 Western Military District (HQ Atyrau)
 Southern Military District (HQ Taraz)

The Eastern Military District was formed on the basis of the administration of the 1st Army Corps. The Directorate of the Southern Military District (Military Unit 03858) was created in Taraz on 15 September 2000, on the basis of the directorate of the 2nd Army Corps and the Directorate of the Ground Forces. On 7 May 2003, the military districts were renamed into regional commands Currently, the ground forces include four regional commands:
Regional Command "Astana" (HQ Karaganda)
Regional Command "East" (HQ Semey)
Regional Command "West" (HQ Atyrau)
Regional Command "South" (HQ Taraz)

Each of the commands have the following general composition:

One mechanized division (comprising three tank regiments and one artillery regiment)
One motor rifle division (comprising one tank brigade, two motor rifle regiments, and one artillery regiment)
One training center with two motor rifle regiments
One motor rifle training regiment
One tank training regiment
One artillery regiment
Three independent motor rifle brigades
Two artillery brigades
One engineer brigade

Regional Command "Astana" 
It is located within the administrative boundaries of Akmola, Karagandy Province, Kostanay Province and North Kazakhstan. The command acts as the Supreme Commander's reserve. The District includes the following units:

 7th Separate Motor Rifle Brigade at Karaganda
Reconnaissance Regiment at Aktas
 401st Cannon Artillery Brigade at Ungurtas
 402nd Rocket Artillery Brigade at Priozersk
 403rd Anti-tank Artillery Brigade at Priozersk
 Training Center for Combat Training of Junior Specialists and the Reserve at Spassk
Missile Forces and Artillery Training Center at Priozersk

The command has had the following commanders:

 Major General Vladimir Shatsky (April 2008–?)
Colonel Mereke Kuchekbaev (since 9 January 2020)

Regional Command "East" 
It is located within the administrative boundaries of East Kazakhstan and Pavlodar Province (Families, Ust-Kamenogorsk, George, and Ayagoz Usharalsky Garrisons). The District has the following units:

 3rd Mechanized Brigade (formerly the 78th Tank Division) at Ayaguz
3rd Separate Motor Rifle Brigade at Usharal (Military Unit No.40398, formed on the basis of a motor rifle regiment of the 155th Motor Rifle Division)
 4th Mechanized Brigade at Novo-Akhmirovo, Ust-Kamenogorsk (Military Unit No.27943)
8th Mechanized Brigade at Semey
11th Tank Brigade at Ayagoz
34th Artillery Brigade at Usharal
101st Missile Brigade at Semey
102nd Rocket Artillery Brigade at Semey
103rd Cannon Artillery Brigade at Semey
Separate Reconnaissance Regiment at Semey
Separate Communications Brigade at Semey
 Artillery Brigade
 Air Defence Missile Brigade
Three Storage Bases

The command has had the following commanders:

 Lieutenant General Nikolai Pospelov (September 2008–?)
Major General Asan Zhusupov (since September 2019)

Regional Command "West" 
It is located within the administrative boundaries of the West Kazakhstan Province, Aktobe Province, Atyrau Province and Mangystau Province. The main task is ensuring the integrity of state borders, territorial integrity, sovereignty and economic interests of Kazakhstan in the Kazakh sector of the Caspian Sea. The District has the following units:

 100th Artillery Brigade at Aktobe
 Separate Motorized Rifle Battalion at Aktobe
 390th Guards Naval Infantry Brigade at Aktau
 Separate Reconnaissance Regiment at Atyrau
 Separate Motorized Rifle Battalion at Beineu
 Separate Motor Rifle Brigade
 Artillery Brigade

The command has had the following commanders:

 General Alimzhan Erniyazov (November 6, 2008 – July 28, 2009)
 Major General Aldiyarov Nurlan Kapanovich (May 6, 2021 – June 9, 2022)
 Major General Ospanov Daulet Ryskulbekovich (June 9, 2022)

Regional Command "South" 
It is located within the administrative boundaries of Almaty Province, Zhambyl Province, South Kazakhstan Province and Kyzylorda Province. The district's main task is ensuring security in the south-eastern borders of the country. The District includes the following:

 5th Mountain Rifle Brigade at Taraz
 Separate Motor Rifle Battalion at Lugovoi
 Separate Tank Battalion at Lugovoi
 Separate Reconnaissance Battalion at Lugovoi
 Separate Motor Rifle Battalion at Merke
 6th Mechanized Brigade at Shymkent
 Separate Mountain-Jaeger Regiment 
 40th Otar Military Base
 12th Mechanized Brigade
 54th Guards Artillery Brigade
 23rd Engineer Brigade
 Training Center of the Ground Forces named after Karasai Batyr
 221st Separate Communications Brigade at Taraz
 232nd Engineer Brigade at Kapchagai

The command has had the following commanders:

 General Uali Elamanov (2003—2004)
 General Bakhtiyar Syzdykov (2004—2007)
General Bulat Darbekov (2007—2008)
General Alikhan Dzharbulov (2008–?)
Major General Talgat Koibakov (2012–2016)
Major General Marat Khusainov (2016–2019)
Major General Kaidar Karakulov (since 2019)

Air Assault Forces 

The Kazakh Air Assault Forces were formed by grouping the 35th Guards Air Assault Brigade (which arrived from Germany in April 1991, and was taken over by Kazakhstan in 1992) with new brigades formed from previous Soviet units. In October 2003, the 36th Separate Air Assault Brigade was formed on the basis of the 2nd Motor Rifle Brigade. On the basis of Taldykorgan Motor Rifle Regiment, in April 2003 the 37th Separate Air Assault Brigade was formed. The 38th Air Assault Brigade is also known as the KAZBRIG Peacekeeping Brigade and was given its current name in 2007.

The Airmobile Forces consists of the following units:

 35th Guards Air Assault Brigade (Kapshagai)
 36th Air Assault Brigade (Nur-Sultan)
 37th Air Assault Brigade (Taldykorgan)
 38th Air Assault Brigade

Artillery and Missile Forces 
The Artillery and Missile Forces of Kazakhstan was formed in 1992 on the basis of the headquarters of the Missile Forces and Artillery of the Central Asian Military District of the Soviet Armed Forces. At first, they were structurally part of the Special Forces of the Ministry of Defense, and then the General Purpose Forces. Since 2003, they have operated as a separate branch of the military under the Ground Forces.  Units and subunits are equipped with all the necessary types of missile and artillery systems of caliber from 82 to 300 mm.

The Department of Artillery has been operating at the Military Institute of the Ground Forces since 1993, which annually graduates up to 60 officers-artillerymen. In 2014, on the basis of the National University of Defense, the Department of Missile Forces and Artillery was created. Professional officers of this profile are also trained at the Mikhailovskaya Military Artillery Academy in St. Petersburg. Additionally, the forces are replenished by graduates of the military departments of the Karaganda State Technical University and the Almaty Satbayev University. In 1998, at the Matybulak training ground, three Tochka-U tactical missiles were launched, the launch of the first rocket from which was then carried out by President Nazarbayev. In 2002, at the Saryshagan training ground, operational-tactical exercises of the Rocket Forces and Artillery “Shield of the Motherland” were held.

The current commander is Colonel Askar Zholamanov. 19 November is celebrated as the Day of Missile Forces and Artillery.

Training

Military Institute 

The Military Institute of the Kazakh Ground Forces ( / Құрлық әскерлерінің әскери институты) is the main educational institute of the Ground Forces, and one of the leading Kazakh military academies. It has many notable alumni, including Lieutenant General Murat Maikeyev, Colonel General Saken Zhasuzakov and Major General Abibilla Kudayberdiev.

Junior Specialist Training 
The training of junior specialists of rank and file in military accounting specialties for the Ground Forces is carried out in the following training centers:

Training Center for Junior Specialists of the Kazakh Ground Forces named for Karasai Batyr – Jambyl Region
Training Center for Combat Training of Junior Specialists and the Reserve of the Ground Forces – Spassk, Karaganda
Training Center of the Missile Forces and Artillery – Priozersk, Karaganda

Cadet Corps 
The Cadet Corps named after Shoqan Walikhanov is an institution of the ministry of defense was formed on 1 July 1996 as a secondary school that prepared Kazakh youth for service in the military. A month after its formation, the corps had 96 enlisted cadets, most of whom came from the Alma-Ata Higher All-Arms Command School. On its first graduation day in 1999, the corps received its own battle flag by the then head of the corps, Colonel Kuangaliev and defense minister Mukhtar Altynbayev. The corps is currently based in the city of Shchuchinsk in the Akmola Region.

Foreign education 
Some of Kazakhstan's officers have trained at the United States Military Academy at West Point.

Equipment

Small arms

Vehicles

Surveillance Unmanned Aerial Vehicles

References 

Military of Kazakhstan
Armies by country
Military units and formations established in 1993